Tom Carr (born 8 January 1956) is a sculptor who works in Spain.

Biography
Carr was born in Tarragona, Spain, but spent his teenage years in the USA.

His first solo exhibition in the USA was in 1989 at the Jan Baum Gallery in Los Angeles. His painted wood sculptures included a 12-feet high, walk-in installation entitled ""Wall with Passageway".

References

Further reading
 Joan-Francesc Ainaud, Sylvie Boulanger, Vicenç Altaió (2000). Tom Carr, Orbis (in Spanish). Barcelona: Generalitat de Catalunya, Departament de Cultura y Actar. 
 Françoise Barbe-Gall and Christine Buci-Glucksmann (2002). Tom Carr, Cycle et Coïncidence (in French). Céret, France: Musée d’art moderne Céret. 
 Françoise Barbe-Gall (2003). Versus, Tom Carr. Valladolid, Spain: Junta de Castilla y León. 
  (2007). Tom Carr, du jardin imparfait (in French). Geneva: Bartha & Senarclens.

External links

Living people
1956 births
Spanish sculptors
Spanish male sculptors
People from Tarragona